The Wild Wild West is an American television series that ran on the CBS network from 1965 to 1969. During its four-season run a total of 104 episodes were broadcast. The Wild Wild West blended Westerns – hugely popular on television at the time (Gunsmoke, Bonanza, Wagon Train, Rawhide, etc.) – with spy adventure, which came into vogue in the wake of the highly successful James Bond films, resulting in such spy-oriented series as The Man from U.N.C.L.E., The Avengers and Secret Agent. 
 
The Wild Wild West is set in the 1870s and deals with the exploits of James West (played by Robert Conrad) and Artemus Gordon (Ross Martin), two agents of the United States Secret Service who work directly under the command of President Ulysses S. Grant. James West is presented as a sort of "James Bond of the West", i.e. the handsome, muscular action-hero who is handy with his fists, as well as a dashing ladies' man. Artemus Gordon is West's partner, a master of disguises and also the inventor of the many gadgets that the two of them use in the course of their adventures. The two men travel about in a private train and use their talents to vanquish the many dastardly villains that threatened the United States – among them, disgraced ex-soldiers seeking revenge against President Grant, power-hungry megalomaniacs, and mad scientists with their brilliant but diabolical inventions. The last group includes the recurring character of Dr. Miguelito Loveless, played by 3'11" Michael Dunn. As series producer Bruce Lansbury stated:

"Jim [West]'s world was one of two-faced villainy, male and female, countless 'Mickey Finns', and needle-tipped baroque pinkie rings that put him to sleep even as he embraced their dispensers. There were inevitable trap doors, hotel walls that ground their victims to dust or revolved into lush Aubrey Beardsley settings next door, lethal chairs that tossed occupants skyward or alternatively dumped them into dank sewers that subterraneously crisscrossed countless cow towns of the period. And then there was that old Dutch sea captain, leaning in the corner of the swill-hole of a bar, who inexplicably winked at Jim as he entered … Artemus, of course, in one of his thousand disguises."

Ten years after the series was cancelled a made-for-television revival movie, The Wild Wild West Revisited, aired and was successful enough to warrant a follow-up entitled More Wild Wild West (1980), thus bringing the total number of episodes up to 106. However, the movie was more campy compared to the serious tone of the television series. The death of Ross Martin in 1981 ended any plans for another film.

The complete run of the series is present below in broadcast order. Included are the episode titles, directors, writers, broadcast dates, production codes, guest stars and the roles they played, and a brief plot synopsis. Also, the various disguises that Ross Martin used in his Artemus Gordon character are listed.

Series overview

Episodes

Season 1 (1965–66)

The Wild Wild West was created by Michael Garrison, a movie producer (Peyton Place, The Long, Hot Summer, An Affair to Remember) who had, at one time, co-owned the rights to Ian Fleming's first James Bond novel, Casino Royale. Garrison produced the series pilot episode himself but, once the series was approved by the CBS network, it became necessary to find a more experienced producer to handle the subsequent episodes. Garrison, in the meantime, was moved into the position of Executive Producer. 

Collier Young, who hitherto had produced a series entitled The Rogues, was assigned to The Wild Wild West but, after overseeing only three episodes, was replaced due to "a difference in concept between the network and [him]." Fred Freiberger, his replacement, brought the series back on track with adventures featuring beautiful women, strong adversaries, and "something very bizarre." Also under Freiberger the character of Dr. Loveless was created. Loveless became an immediate hit, resulting in actor Michael Dunn being contracted to do four episodes per season. However, after producing ten episodes, Fred Freiberger was replaced by John Mantley, reputedly due to a behind-the-scenes power struggle. Mantley, who had been associate producer on Gunsmoke, produced seven episodes before he too was replaced. Mantley returned to his former position on Gunsmoke while Gene L. Coon took over the production reins for of The Wild Wild West. However, Coon left after six episodes to take a screenwriting assignment at Warner Bros., leaving Michael Garrison to take on double-duty as producer and executive producer for the remainder of the season.

The 28 first-season episodes of The Wild Wild West, all of which were photographed in black and white, were not broadcast in the order that they were filmed. Notably, the early ones produced by Collier Young were moved back in the broadcast schedule in favor of the Fred Freiberger- and John Mantley-produced episodes. The breakdown in broadcast order is thus:
 Michael Garrison – Episodes 1 and 28
 Collier Young – Episodes 5, 9 and 15
 Fred Freiberger – Episodes 2–4, 6–8 and 10–13
 John Mantley – Episodes 14 and 16–21
 Gene L. Coon – Episodes 22–27
During this season, The Wild Wild West placed at #23 in the ratings for the 1965–1966 season. One episode of this season, "The Night of the Howling Light", received an Emmy nomination for Best Cinematography.

Season 2 (1966–67)

The second season of The Wild Wild West continued the basic format of first season, but also made some changes. The most notable of these was that the series was now shot in color, which enhanced the Victorian ambiance of the 1870s setting. Both Robert Conrad and Ross Martin were given modified wardrobes, with Conrad wearing short bolero jackets and tight-fitting pants (he wore bolero jackets through the first season as well. There was also a shift in the choreography of the fight scenes, changing the emphasis from karate (largely used in the first season) to boxing.

As in the first season, Dr. Loveless was featured in four episodes. Meanwhile, an attempt was made to establish another recurring villain with the character of Count Manzeppi (played by Victor Buono, who had appeared in the pilot episode). However, the Count was dropped after only two episodes.

Again, as in the first season, 28 episodes were produced for the season. Initially, Michael Garrison continued in the dual capacity as producer and executive producer. However, after seven episodes, the producing chores were handed to Bruce Lansbury, the younger brother of actress Angela Lansbury, and Garrison returned to working solely as the series' executive producer. Garrison died on August 17, 1966, when he fell down a flight of stairs at his home in Bel Air.

The breakdown between the two producers, as broadcast, is:

 Michael Garrison – Season episodes 1–5, 12 and 14
 Bruce Lansbury – Season episodes 6–11, 13 and 15–28

However, the series continued to be listed as "A Michael Garrison Production in association with the CBS Television Network" in the end credits for the rest of the run.

The Wild Wild West slipped in the ratings during the second season, falling to 53rd in the Nielsens for the 1966-67 season.
However, guest star Agnes Moorehead won an Emmy Award as Best Supporting Actress in a Drama Series for her performance in the episode "The Night of the Vicious Valentine".

Season 3 (1967–68)
The third season of The Wild Wild West saw a shift away from fantasy and more toward traditional western with the "villains becoming more political and less outrageous." Also, because of serious health problems, Michael Dunn appeared as Dr. Loveless in only one episode during this season ("The Night Dr. Loveless Died").

On January 24, 1968, when The Wild Wild West was near the end of shooting for the season, star Robert Conrad, who did the majority of his own stunt work, was seriously injured when he fell from a chandelier during the filming of the episode "The Night of the Fugitives". Production was shut down for the season and the "Fugitives" was completed and broadcast during the fourth season.

All of the episodes of this season were produced by Bruce Lansbury. Due to Conrad's injury only 24 episodes were made for this season. For its third season, the series rebounded slightly in the Nielsen ratings, moving up to 40th place from the previous season ranking of 53rd.

Season 4 (1968–69)
Due to his injury near the end of filming of the previous season, the fourth season of The Wild Wild West forced Robert Conrad to use a double for any stunt that the studio considered "chancy." On June 26, 1968, during filming of "The Night of the Avaricious Actuary" Ross Martin fell and received a hairline fracture in his shin. As a result, the script for the next episode filmed, "The Night of the Juggernaut", was re-written to have Martin's character, Artemus Gordon, receive a leg injury. On August 17 of the same year Martin suffered a massive heart attack. A five-week hiatus in filming had just begun, but Martin's recovery time was much longer. Nine episodes were filmed without Martin although he continued to have co-star billing in the opening credits. The absence of his character was explained as being on "special assignment" in Washington, D.C.

Ross Martin returned to filming for the final three episodes of the season, which also turned out to be the last episodes of the entire series. The Wild Wild West experienced a precipitous decline in its Nielsen ratings, falling to 87th place out of 92 series for the 1968-69 television season. Due to declining ratings, as well as a crack-down on programs with excessive violence, the series was cancelled after four seasons.

During this season, Ross Martin received an Emmy Award nomination for leading actor in a drama series. All of the fourth-season episodes were produced by Bruce Lansbury.

Television movies (1979–80)
Ten years after the cancellation of The Wild Wild West Robert Conrad and Ross Martin reunited and reprised their respective roles as government agents James West and Artemus Gordon in a television reunion film, The Wild Wild West Revisited. This film proved to be one of CBS' highest rated specials of the year, thus warranting a second reunion film, More Wild Wild West. The second film, however, proved less successful.

These two reunion movies were produced by Robert Jacks and directed by Burt Kennedy and are notably more comical than the original series.

Emmy Awards
During its four-year run The Wild Wild West received three Emmy nominations:

Home releases
The entire four-season run of The Wild Wild West is available on DVD from Paramount Home Video in both individual box sets of each season as well as a box containing the whole series. However, only the latter contains the reunion films.

Producers
The Wild Wild West had six different producers during the course of its four-season run, plus a seventh for the two reunion movies. A breakdown of the episodes and their producers appears in the chart below.

Directors
The Wild Wild West employed a large number of directors during its run, with Irving J. Moore directing the most episodes (25 total).

Of note is that three episodes were directed by William Witney, who had co-directed many "cliffhangers" during the 1930s and 1940s, including Zorro Rides Again, The Lone Ranger and The Adventures of Captain Marvel. Also among the series directors are Mark Rydell (who would go on to direct On Golden Pond with Katharine Hepburn, Henry Fonda and Jane Fonda) and Richard Donner (later to direct The Omen, Superman, and the Lethal Weapon series).

Guest stars
During its run, The Wild Wild West featured a large number of notable guest stars. Many of these guests also appeared on Star Trek. These actors and the titles to the episodes of both series that they appeared in are listed below. A video montage of some of these performance can be found on YouTube.

Some guest stars who appeared only on The Wild Wild West were:

Charles Aidman- (The Night of the Camera, The Night of Miguelito's Revenge, The Night of the Pelican, The Night of the Janus)
Edward Andrews- (The Night of the Brain)
John Astin- (The Night of the Tartar)
Vincent Beck- (The Night of the Pelican)
Henry Beckman- (The Night of the Torture Chamber, The Night of the Vicious Valentine)  
Ed Begley- (The Night of the Infernal Machine)
Lloyd Bochner- (The Night of the Puppeteer) 
Victor Buono- (The Night of the Inferno, The Night of the Eccentrics, The Night of the Feathered Fury)
Walter Burke- (The Night of the Cut-Throats)
Joseph Campanella- (The Night of the Wolf)
Michele Carey- (The Night of the Feathered Fury, The Night of the Winged Terror: Parts 1 & 2)
Christopher Cary- (The Night of the Poisonous Posey, The Night of the Winged Terror: Parts 1 & 2)
Sammy Davis Jr.- (The Night of the Returning Dead)
John Dehner- (Night of the Casual Killer, The Night of the Steel Assassin)
Khigh Dhiegh- (The Night of the Samurai, The Night of the Pelican)
Bradford Dillman- (The Night of the Cut-Throats)
Phoebe Dorin- (The Night the Wizard Shook the Earth, The Night That Terror Stalked the Town, The Night of the Whirring Death, The Night of the Murderous Spring, The Night of the Raven, The Night of the Green Terror)
John Doucette- (The Night of the Flaming Ghost, The Night of the Surreal McCoy) 
Robert Drivas- (The Night of the Burning Diamond)
Robert Duvall- (The Night of the Falcon)
Anthony Eisley- (The Night of the Eccentrics, The Night of the Janus)
Robert Ellenstein- (The Night of the Flaming Ghost, The Night Dr. Loveless Died, The Night of the Gruesome Games, The Night of the Winged Terror: Parts 1 & 2) 
Roy Engel- (The Night of the Steel Assassin, The Night of the Colonel's Ghost, The Night of the Arrow, The Night of the Death-Maker, The Night of the Big Blackmail, The Night of the Winged Terror: Part 1)
Bernard Fox- (The Night of the Winged Terror: Part 1)
Beverly Garland- (The Night of the Cut-Throats, The Night of the Bleak Island)
Lisa Gaye- (The Night of the Skulls, The Night of the Falcon)
Don Gordon- (The Night of the Cadre)
Harold Gould- (The Night of the Bubbling Death, The Night of the Avaricious Actuary)
Kevin Hagen- (The Night of the Amnesiac)
Alan Hale Jr.- (The Night of the Sabatini Death)
Hurd Hatfield- (The Night of the Man-Eating House, The Night of the Undead)
Douglas Henderson- (The Night of the Skulls, The Night of the Falcon, The Night of the Turncoat, The Night of the Underground Terror, The Night of the Death Masks, The Night of the Fugitives, The Night of Miguelito's Revenge, The Night of the Sabatini Death, The Night of the Diva, The Night of the Plague)   
Boris Karloff- (The Night of the Golden Cobra)
Sandy Kenyon- (The Night of Sudden Death)
Richard Kiel- (The Night the Wizard Shook the Earth, The Night That Terror Stalked the Town, The Night of the Whirring Death, The Night of the Simian Terror) 
 Harvey Korman- (The Night of the Big Blackmail)
Martin Landau- (The Night of the Red-Eyed Madmen)
Ronald Long- (The Night of the Gypsy Peril)
Ida Lupino- (The Night Of The Big Blast) 
John Marley- (The Night of the Wolf)
Scott Marlowe- (The Night of the Howling Light)
Kevin McCarthy- (The Night of the Doomsday Formula)
Burgess Meredith- (The Night of the Human Trigger) 
Agnes Moorehead- (The Night of the Vicious Valentine)
Priscilla Morrill- (The Night of the Undead)
Leslie Nielsen- (The Night of the Double-Edged Knife)
Carroll O'Connor- (The Night of the Ready-Made Corpse)
Nehemiah Persoff- (The Night of the Inferno, The Night of the Deadly Blossom, The Night of the Underground Terror)
Ford Rainey- (The Night of the Flying Pie Plate, The Night of the Iron Fist, The Night of the Kraken) 
Pernell Roberts- (The Night of the Firebrand)
Don Rickles- (The Night of the Druid's Blood)
Lorri Scott- (The Night of the Wolf)
William Talman- (The Night of the Man-Eating House)
Sigrid Valdis- (The Night the Wizard Shook the Earth, The Night of the Torture Chamber) 
Donald Woods- (The Night of the Skulls, The Night of the Assassin)
H.M. Wynant- (The Night of the Torture Chamber, The Night of the Sudden Plague, The Night of the Poisonous Posey, The Night of the Simian Terror)
Keenan Wynn- (The Night of the Freebooters) 
John Zaremba- (The Night of the Undead)

Some guest stars who only appeared on Star Trek were:
Michael Ansara- (Day of the Dove)
Lou Antonio- (Let That Be Your Last Battlefield)
Barbara Babcock- (A Taste of Armageddon, Plato's Stepchildren)
Whit Bissell- (The Trouble with Tribbles)
Joan Collins- (The City on the Edge of Forever)
James Daly- (Requiem for Methuselah) 
Diana Ewing- (The Cloud Minders)
Michael Forest- (Who Mourns for Adonais?)
Frank Gorshin- (Let That Be Your Last Battlefield)
Skip Homeier- (Patterns of Force, The Way to Eden)
Sally Kellerman- (Where No Man Has Gone Before)
Nancy Kovack- (A Private Little War)
Don Marshall- (The Galileo Seven)
Lee Meriwether- (That Which Survives)
Charles Napier- (The Way to Eden)
Julie Newmar- (Friday's Child)
Warren Stevens- (By Any Other Name)
Robert Walker Jr- (Charlie X)
Kenneth Washington- (That Which Survives)

Footnotes

References
Books
 
  (Cangey was a stunt man on the series.)

Webpages
 The Wildest Home Page in the West. Wayback Machine archived page of now defunct fan page.
 The Wild Wild West — World Wide Web Page. Wayback Machine archived page of now defunct fan page.
 An episode guide
 Another episode guide.
 A list that attempts to place the episodes in a chronological order.

External links
 

Lists of American fantasy television series episodes
Lists of American science fiction television series episodes
Lists of American Western (genre) television series episodes